Atlantis: The Antediluvian World is a pseudoarchaeological book published in 1882 by Minnesota populist politician Ignatius L. Donnelly, who was born in Philadelphia, Pennsylvania in 1831. Donnelly considered Plato's account of Atlantis as largely factual and suggested that all known ancient civilizations were descended from this lost land.

Content
Many of its theories are the source of many modern-day concepts about Atlantis, including these: the civilization and technology beyond its time, the origins of all present races and civilizations, and a civil war between good and evil. Much of Donnelly's writing, especially with regard to Atlantis as an explanation for similarities between ancient civilizations of the Old and New Worlds, was inspired by the publications of Charles Étienne Brasseur de Bourbourg and the fieldwork of Augustus Le Plongeon in the Yucatan. It was avidly supported by publications of Helena Blavatsky and the Theosophical Society as well as by Rudolf Steiner.

Author's stated intentions
Donnelly discusses many aspects of his proposed theory in extreme detail. He includes many illustrations as well as charts with lingual similarities. With his book he states that he is trying to prove thirteen distinct hypotheses:
 There once existed in the Atlantic Ocean, opposite the Mediterranean Sea, a large island, which was the remnant of an Atlantic continent, and known to the ancients as Atlantis.
 That the description of this island given by Plato is not fable, as has been long supposed, but veritable history.
 That Atlantis was the region where man first rose from a state of barbarism to civilization.
 That it became, in the course of ages, a populous and mighty nation, from whose emigrants the shores of the Gulf of Mexico, the Mississippi River, the Amazon River, the Pacific coast of South America, the Mediterranean, the west coast of Europe and Africa, the Baltic, the Black Sea, and the Caspian were populated by civilized nations.
 That it was the true Antediluvian world: the Garden of Eden; the Gardens of Hesperides; the Elysian Fields; the Gardens of Alcinous; the Mesomphalos, the Olympos; the Asgard of the traditions of the ancient nations. That it represented a universal memory of a great land, where early mankind dwelt for ages in peace and happiness.
 That the gods and goddesses of the ancient Greeks, the Phoenicians, the Hindus, and the Scandinavians were simply the kings, queens, and heroes of Atlantis; and the acts attributed to them in mythology are a confused recollection of real historical events.
 That the mythology of Egypt and Peru represented the original religion of Atlantis, which was sun-worship.
 That the oldest colony formed by Atlantis was probably Egypt, whose civilization was a reproduction of that Atlantic island.
 That the implements of the "Bronze Age" of Europe were derived from Atlantis. The Atlanteans were also the first manufacturers of iron.
 That the Phoenician alphabet, parent of all the European alphabets, was derived from an Atlantis alphabet, which was also conveyed by them from Atlantis to the Mayans of Central America.
 That Atlantis was the original seat of the Aryan or Indo-European family of nations, as well as of the Semitic peoples, and possibly also of the Turanian races.
 That Atlantis perished in a terrible convulsion of nature, in which the whole island sunk into the ocean, with nearly all its inhabitants.
 That a few persons escaped in ships and on rafts, and carried to the nations east and west the tidings of the appalling catastrophe, which has survived to our own time in the Flood and Deluge legends of the different nations of the old and new worlds.

Legacy
In 1883, a sequel or companion, Ragnarok: The Age of Fire and Gravel, was published.

Donnelly's work on Atlantis inspired books by James Churchward on the lost continent of Mu, also known as Lemuria. More recently, his theories have influenced the visions of Edgar Cayce, creation of the superhero Namor the Sub-Mariner, the 1969 pop song "Atlantis" by Donovan, the 2001 film Atlantis: The Lost Empire and the plot of the 2009 film 2012 by Roland Emmerich. Graham Hancock's Fingerprints of the Gods proposes, like Donnelly, that civilizations in Egypt and the Americas had a common origin in a civilization lost to history, although in Hancock's book the civilization was not located in the northern Atlantic.

See also
 The Lost Continent: The Story of Atlantis
 Fingerprints of the Gods

References

Further reading

External links

 Entire text in HTML format from the Internet Sacred Text Archive
 Entire text in multiple formats from Project Gutenberg
 Entire scanned text from the Internet Archive
 

1882 non-fiction books
Books about Atlantis
Pseudoarchaeological texts
Harper & Brothers books